Abram Smith (born September 14, 1998) is an American football running back for the DC Defenders of the XFL. He played college football at Baylor University.

High school career
Smith attended Abilene High School in Abilene, Texas. During his high school career, he rushed for a school record 4,955 yards and 77 touchdowns. He originally committed to play college football at the University of Tulsa before changing his commitment to Baylor University.

College career
After taking a medical redshirt his first year at Baylor in 2017, Smith played in six games in 2018, rushing four times for 11 yards. As a sophomore in 2019, he played in all 14 games, rushing eight times for 35 yards. Smith moved from running back to linebacker in 2020. He finished the season with 48 tackles and one sack. Smith moved back to running back his senior season and became the starter.

Smith was named the starting running back for the 2021 Baylor Bears football team and helped lead the Bears to a school record 12–2 season capped with a 2021 Big 12 Championship Game title and a 2022 Sugar Bowl victory. During the 2022 Sugar Bowl versus the Ole Miss Rebels, Smith rushed for 172 yards on 25 carries. With his Sugar Bowl performance, Smith broke the Baylor single season rushing record with 1,601 yards, which was previously held by Terrance Ganaway (1,547 yards in 2011). Smith was named second-team All-Big 12 and a finalist for the Earl Campbell Tyler Rose Award (2021).

College statistics

Professional career

New Orleans Saints 
Smith signed with the New Orleans Saints as an undrafted free agent on May 1, 2022. He was waived on August 28.

D.C. Defenders 
Smith was drafted with the 1st overall pick in the 2023 XFL Draft during the first phase (Skill Players) of the draft by the DC Defenders.

References

External links
 New Orleans Saints bio
Baylor Bears bio

1998 births
Living people
Players of American football from Texas
Sportspeople from Abilene, Texas
American football running backs
American football linebackers
Baylor Bears football players
New Orleans Saints players
DC Defenders players